"First Day of My Life" is a song by the Finnish alternative rock band The Rasmus, originally released on the band's fifth album Dead Letters on 21 March 2003. It became one of numerous hit singles from the album, with the highest position being No. 4 in Finland.

The single was released on 15 October 2003 by the record label Playground Music. The single (which was the third from Dead Letters) features the music video of the song. UK edition also includes "Guilty" (live) and the b-side "Since You've Been Gone".

Lyrical meaning
Singer Lauri Ylönen explains the song as follows:
Flashing up from our German tour. We were watching a movie in the back of the tour bus, and in the movie there was a sentence "through the darkness". I took my guitar and made a chorus immediately. The song is about the band, being on tour and dreaming.

Single track listing
Original version (2003)
 "First Day of My Life" - 3:44
 The "First Day of My Life" music video as MPEG

UK edition (2004)
 "First Day of My Life" - 3:44
 "Guilty" [live]
 "Since You've Been Gone"
 The "First Day of My Life" music video

Music video
The music video for "First Day of My Life" was shot on a speedway in Germany the same year. It was directed by Sven Bollinger and produced by Volker Steinmetz (Erste Liebe Filmproduktion) in Lausitzring.

Charts

Weekly charts

Year-end charts

References

External links
 The Rasmus' official website
 Lyrics
 "First Day of My Life" music video on YouTube
 "First Day of My Life" fanlisting

The Rasmus songs
2003 singles
Rock ballads
Songs written by Lauri Ylönen
Playground Music Scandinavia singles
2003 songs